"Maxine" is a song by New Zealand singer and songwriter Sharon O'Neill. The song was released in May 1983 as the second single from her fourth studio album, Foreign Affairs (1983). The song peaked at number 16 in Australia and New Zealand. It remain's O'Neill's highest charting single in Australia.

Background and release 
Late in 1981, O'Neill moved from New Zealand to Sydney, New South Wales, Australia to pursue her music career. It was here that she wrote "Maxine", a song that chronicled the life of a Kings Cross prostitute. In a 2016 interview, O'Neill said; "I was living in a hotel in Kings Cross when I got the inspiration to write "Maxine". She was always out there working at 3am when we'd get home bleary-eyed from a gig"

Two music videos were filmed: one in New Zealand for general audiences, and the other in Sydney with far more explicit themes.

Track listing 
7" (BA 223082)
Side A "Maxine" – 4:35
Side B "All The Way Down" – 2:02

Charts

Cover versions 
 In 1996, Lizzie Brennan recorded a version on her album, Statues in the Park.
 In 2006, Rietta recorded a version on her album, Cut Me Loose.
 In 2016, Handsome Young Strangers recorded a version on their EP Battle of Broken Hill.

References 

1983 songs
1983 singles
Sharon O'Neill songs
Songs written by Sharon O'Neill
Rock ballads